Rockcliffe railway station, later Rockcliffe Halt was a station which served the rural area around Rockcliffe, Rockcliffe parish, north of Carlisle in the English county of Cumberland (now part of Cumbria). It was served by local trains on what is now known as the West Coast Main Line. The nearest station for Rockcliffe is now at Carlisle. It lay some distance from the village.

History 
Opened by the Caledonian Railway, it became part of the London Midland and Scottish Railway during the Grouping of 1923 and BR in 1948. It closed briefly during WW1 and was renamed as Rockcliffe Halt in 1950 when regular passenger service ceased after which it was only used by railway workers at the nearby marshalling yards  until 1965.

The station had a stationmaster's house, with combined ticket office and a waiting room. The line is still double track here.

The site today 
Trains pass at speed on the electrified West Coast Main Line. The station platforms have been demolished, the pedestrian overbridge has been removed, however the stationmaster's house remains as a private dwelling.

References

Notes

Sources

External links
 Rail Brit
 Cumbrian Railways Association
 Rockcliffe Station
 Cumbria Gazetteer

Railway stations in Great Britain opened in 1847
Railway stations in Great Britain closed in 1917
Railway stations in Great Britain opened in 1919
Railway stations in Great Britain closed in 1965
Disused railway stations in Cumbria
Former Caledonian Railway stations
1847 establishments in England
1965 disestablishments in England
Rockcliffe, Cumbria